David Clarke is the founder and chairman of the Australian online travel agent Webjet Limited, listed as ASX: WEB.

Clarke started Webjet as a hobby after he semi-retired at the age of 50.  When the company floated on the Australian Securities Exchange in 1999, Webjet was valued at 4 million. In 2008 Webjet recorded A$350 million in revenue.

References

External links
David Clark, Webjet Board.

Australian businesspeople
Living people
Year of birth missing (living people)